In mathematics, in particular abstract algebra and topology, a differential graded algebra is a graded associative algebra with an added chain complex structure that respects the algebra structure.



Definition 
A differential graded algebra (or DG-algebra for short) A is a graded algebra equipped with a map  which has either degree 1 (cochain complex convention) or degree −1 (chain complex convention) that satisfies two conditions:

A more succinct way to state the same definition is to say that a DG-algebra is a monoid object in the monoidal category of chain complexes.
A DG morphism between DG-algebras is a graded algebra homomorphism which respects the differential d.

A differential graded augmented algebra (also called a DGA-algebra,
an augmented DG-algebra or simply a DGA) is a DG-algebra equipped with a DG morphism to the ground ring (the terminology is due to Henri Cartan).

Warning: some sources use the term DGA for a DG-algebra.

Examples of DG-algebras

Tensor algebra 
The tensor algebra is a DG-algebra with differential similar to that of the Koszul complex. For a vector space  over a field  there is a graded vector space  defined as

where .

If  is a basis for  there is a differential  on the tensor algebra defined component-wise

sending basis elements to

In particular we have  and so

Koszul complex 
One of the foundational examples of a differential graded algebra, widely used in commutative algebra and algebraic geometry, is the Koszul complex. This is because of its wide array of applications, including constructing flat resolutions of complete intersections, and from a derived perspective, they give the derived algebra representing a derived critical locus.

De-Rham algebra 
Differential forms on a manifold, together with the exterior derivation and the exterior product form a DG-algebra. These have wide applications, including in derived deformation theory. See also de Rham cohomology.

Singular cohomology 
This differential graded algebra was used to help compute the cohomology of Eilenberg–MacLane spaces in the Cartan seminar.

Other facts about DG-algebras 
 The homology  of a DG-algebra  is a graded algebra. The homology of a DGA-algebra is an augmented algebra.

See also 

 Homotopy associative algebra
 Differential graded category
 Differential graded Lie algebra
 Differential graded scheme
 Differential graded module

References 

 , see sections V.3 and V.5.6

Algebras
Homological algebra
commutative algebra
Differential algebra